Talesha Quinn (born 13 June 1989) is an Australian rugby league footballer who plays for the North Sydney Bears in the NSWRL Women's Premiership. 

Background
Born in Parkes, New South Wales, Quinn began playing rugby league in 2011 for the Berkeley Eagles.

Playing career
In 2012, Quinn represented New South Wales in a 10–34 loss to Queensland.

In 2013, Quinn moved to Townsville, Queensland due to work commitments. That year, she represented the Women's All Stars.

In 2017, Quinn returned to New South Wales and joined the Cronulla-Sutherland Sharks in the NSWRL Women's Premiership. In October 2017, she made her Test debut for Australia at the 2017 Women's Rugby League World Cup.

In June 2018, she represented the Australian Defence Force at the Women's National Championships. On 5 June 2018, Quinn was announced as one of the inaugural signings for the St George Illawarra Dragons NRL Women's Premiership team.

In Round 2 of the 2018 NRL Women's season, Quinn made her debut for the Dragons in a 22–10 win over the New Zealand Warriors. On 6 October 2018, she represented the Prime Minister's XIII in their 40–4 win over Papua New Guinea.

References

External links
NRL profile

1989 births
Living people
Australian female rugby league players
Australia women's national rugby league team players
Rugby league second-rows
St. George Illawarra Dragons (NRLW) players